HostGator is a Houston-based provider of shared, reseller, virtual private server, and dedicated web hosting with an additional presence in Austin, Texas.

History
HostGator was founded in October 2002  by Brent Oxley, who was then a student at Florida Atlantic University. In 2006, the company moved from the original office in Boca Raton, Florida to a new 20,000 square foot building in Houston, Texas. In June 2006, the company opened its first international office in Canada.

In 2008, Inc. Magazine ranked HostGator in its list of fastest growing companies at 21 in the United States and 1 in the Houston-Sugar Land-Baytown, Texas area The same year, HostGator decided to make their hosting service green hosting
by working with Integrated Ecosystem Market Services.

In 2008, HostGator prepared for competition companies touting themselves as providing "unlimited" hosting services. Founder Brent Oxley was adamant about being able to back up an "unlimited" option prior to offering service named as such and increased staffing. He suggested that this move increased sales by at least 30%.

In 2010, an office was added in Austin, Texas. In May 2011, HostGator started operations in India with a its office in Nashik, Maharashtra and a data centre.

On July 13, 2012, HostGator was sold to Endurance International Group (EIG) for an aggregate purchase price of $299.8 million, of which $227.3 million was paid in cash at the closing. On 21 June 2012, CEO and founder Brent Oxley announced the sale of HostGator, advised employees and users not to worry in part because Oxley would still own the buildings HostGator used. He said he wanted to travel the world before he had children. He was also candid about the failures in creating stable billing and register portions of HostGator, and hoped that Endurance might fix those.

In 2015, HostGator launched Optimized WP, a set of tools for building and maintaining WordPress websites. By the end of 2015, EIG launched local HostGator sites in Brazil, Russia, India, China, Turkey and Mexico. As of 2019, HostGator also offered a web hosting service in the United Kingdom and Australia.

Incidents

2006 Trojan attack Information

In 2006, HostGator suffered from a Trojan attack that affected more than 200 machines.

2012 social engineering attack

In May 2012, the computer hacker group UGNazi claimed responsibility for hacking the web server of the web host billing software developer WHMCS in an apparent social engineering attack involving HostGator. A member of the group Cosmo called WHMCS's hosting provider impersonating a senior employee. They were subsequently granted root access to WHMCS's web server after providing information for identity verification.  UGNazi later leaked publicly WHMCS's SQL database containing user information and 500,000 customer credit cards, website files, and cPanel configuration. After this issue WHMCS emailed members to change their passwords.

2013 service outages
Since its acquisition by Endurance International, HostGator has suffered an increased incidence of server outages and downtime. Notably, on August 2, 2013 and December 31, 2013, Endurance International Group’s data center in Provo, Utah, experienced network outages that affected thousands of customers of Bluehost, HostGator, HostMonster and JustHost.

2019
In January 2019, TechCrunch reported that Paulos Yibelo, a well-known bug hunter found serious vulnerabilities at Bluehost, DreamHost, OVH, iPage and HostGator.

References

External links

Web hosting
Companies established in 2002
Companies based in Houston
2002 establishments in Texas
Endurance International Group